Trinity Academy is a Tamil Nadu, India-based school providing schooling based on matriculation curriculum. It is based in Namakkal. It is Namakkal's first new age school where lunch is provided for students by the school. The principal is Mr.Somasundaram, and the president is Dr. Kuzhandaivelu. The school celebrated its 25th annual day in 2015.

References

External links 
 http://maps.google.co.in/maps?oe=utf-8&rls=org.mozilla:en-US:official&client=firefox-a&um=1&ie=UTF-8&q=trinity+academy+namakkal&fb=1&split=1&gl=in&view=text&latlng=4871450792529357947

Schools in Tamil Nadu
Education in Namakkal district